Vipul Gupta is an actor and model. He is best known for playing the lead role of Drone Keshab in StarPlus' K. Street Pali Hill and as Anand Zorawar Shergill in Ek Nanad Ki Khushiyon Ki Chaabi… Meri Bhabhi. He was seen as Jagat Singh in the 2020 film Tanhaji.

Career
Vipul Gupta is an MBA in Marketing. Before entering into TV serials; he has done many popular TVCs and advertisements for many well-known brands; including Indian Oil, Mountain Dew and LG Mobile.

Vipul started his career with K. Street Pali Hill as Drone Keshab on Star Plus, which gave him the top notch success due to his role as Drone. Followed by that he was offered another daily soap 'India Calling' at the same time. Hence Vipul shifted from K. Street Pali hill to India Calling afterwards; due to the scheduling issues. By the year 2013 he got back again on Star Plus with a daily soap Meri Bhabhi as Anand Shergill; playing the lead on STAR Plus. Meri Bhabhi was also a successful project due to its heart touching story line.

Most of Vipul's fans say that K. Street Pali hill was successful for about a year only; till he was playing the lead. But later it lost its popularity due to his replacement.

Vipul Gupta has also been a brand ambassador for Onida Electronics, which is among India's most trusted brands.

Television

Filmography

Commercials
Airtel
Mountain Dew
Liril
Siyaram Suitings
Pears
Indian Oil

References

External links

Living people
Indian male television actors
Indian male soap opera actors
Male actors from New Delhi
21st-century Indian male actors
Male actors from Delhi
Year of birth missing (living people)